Otto Heinrich Carque (11 July 1867 – 9 January 1935)  was a French–American businessman, fruit grower, naturopath, raw foodist, vegetarian and writer. He was the first to use the term natural food.

Biography

Carque was born on 11 July 1855 in Wiesloch. He lived in Mannheim, Germany and migrated to America as a young man. Carque arrived in New York City in 1887 and became an associate of Henry Edward Lane, a practitioner of iridology. He became a vegetarian before he was 28 and promoted the benefits of a vegetarian diet, exercise, fresh air and nude sunbathing. Carque has been credited as the first person to use the term "natural food" to refer to food that has not been adulterated or refined.

It was reported in 1895 that Carque had "lived 15 years on raw foods, then fresh fruits and vegetables, varied occasionally with eggs, cheese and nut butters, unroasted." In 1912, Carque established the "Carque Pure Food Company". He sold mission figs at a Los Angeles grocery store. From 1922, he wrote advertisements in the Los Angeles Times for his own natural food products consisting mostly of dried fruits and nuts known as "Natural Foods of California".

Carque's Pure Food Company was established at South Magnolia Ave, Los Angeles and specialized in selling sun-dried mission figs, dried fruits and nuts. He advertised his food as "pure natural food products". In 1920, Carque was grinding flour in his own mill. The following year he set up another health food store at West Seventh in Los Angeles. In 1925, he was located at the "Natural Foods Building" at 729 Seward, Los Angeles. He authored a 359-page book titled Natural Foods: The Safe Way to Health. In 1926 he had two more health food shops in downtown Los Angeles.

He married Lillian Carque in California in 1926. In 1931, he renamed his company "Carque Natural Foods". In 1933, Carque closed his shops and moved to South Maple Ave, Glendale where he specialized in wholesale business. 

Carque authored many books and pamphlets which promoted a vegetarian diet. He also opposed the consumption of alcohol, coffee and tea. His book Rational Diet: An Advanced Treatise on the Food Question was advertised and sold by the Defensive Diet League of America.

Carque was an early advocate of the alkaline diet and was concerned that people were in danger of excessive acidity. He argued that the main sources
of alkalinity in the diet were fruits, including citrus fruits. Carque, Eugene Christian and George J. Drews are credited as founding the American raw food movement in the early 20th century.

Death

Carque died on January 9, 1935, from traffic accident injuries. In 1937, Carque's food manufacturing was sold by his wife.

Publications

Meat Eater Vs. Vegetarians (1902)
The Folly of Meat Eating (1904)
The Foundation of All Reform (1904)
Flesh Eating and War (1917)
Rational Diet (1923)
Natural Foods: The Safe Way to Health (1925)
The Key to Rational Dietetics (1926)

See also

Raw foodism

References

1867 births
1935 deaths
Alkaline diet advocates
Alsatian people
American health and wellness writers
American people of French descent
American temperance activists
American vegetarianism activists
Naturopaths
Orthopaths
Pseudoscientific diet advocates
Raw foodists
Social nudity advocates
Tea critics